Phyllonorycter pavoniae is a moth of the family Gracillariidae. It is known from South Africa.

The length of the forewings is 2.5–3 mm. The forewing is elongate and the ground colour is bronze ochreous with a few white and black scales at the base. The hindwings are pale greyish beige and slightly shiny. Adults are on wing from early December to late May.

The larvae feed on Pavonia burchellii and Pavonia praemorsa. They mine the leaves of their host plant. The mine has the form of a moderate, irregular, oblong, semi-transparent, tentiform mine on underside of leaf.

References

Endemic moths of South Africa
Moths described in 1961
pavoniae
Moths of Africa